The Cooley Peninsula (older Cúalṅge) is a hilly peninsula in the north of County Louth on the east coast of Ireland; the peninsula includes the small town of Carlingford, the port of Greenore and the village of Omeath.

Geography
To the north is Carlingford Lough and the border with Northern Ireland; to the south is Dundalk Bay. The peninsula is ringed by the R173 regional road.

The peninsula is geologically diverse, with 440-million-year-old Silurian greywacke sandstones in the northwest and southwest, 340-million-year-old limestones in the east, and 60-million-year-old volcanic rocks forming the Cooley Mountains.

Antiquity
In Irish mythology, Cooley (Old Irish Cúalnge) was the home of the bull Donn Cuailnge, and the site of the Táin Bó Cúailnge, "Cattle Raid of Cooley". Ancient monuments in Cooley include the Proleek Dolmen, whose capstone weighs an estimated 35 tons (31.75 tonnes), and a Bronze Age gallery grave, both near Ballymascanlan.

Business
The peninsula is primarily agricultural territory, but is also home to a number of hotels and bed-and-breakfasts, the first new distillery in Ireland in decades, the Cooley Distillery opened by John Teeling on the site of a former potato alcohol factory, several warehouse and logistics facilities, a garden centre, two cafes and other businesses.

There is a car-ferry connection to County Down in Northern Ireland at Greenore.

Sport
The local Gaelic football and ladies' Gaelic football club is Cooley Kickhams, based south of Carlingford.

People
The Cooley Peninsula is the home of current Leinster and Irish rugby players, Rob Kearney and David Kearney. U.S. President Joe Biden has ancestors from the area. He shares a great-grandfather with the Kearney brothers. RTE sports commentator Jimmy Magee (1935-2017) was raised on the Cooley Peninsula.

References

External links
Awarded "EDEN - European Destinations of Excellence" non traditional tourist destination 2008

Peninsulas of County Louth
Locations in Táin Bó Cúailnge